Kunzea robusta, commonly known as rawirinui or kanuka, is a tree in the myrtle family, Myrtaceae, and is endemic to New Zealand. It has rough, stringy, or corky bark, lance-shaped leaves that are darker on the upper surface, flowers in compact groups of up to 30, each with five or six white petals, and about 35 stamens of varying lengths.

Description
Between 15 and 60 stamens, some slightly longer than the petals and others much shorter are arranged in two indistinct rows around the floral cup. The capsule usually opens to release its seed when mature.

Taxonomy and naming
Kunzea robusta was first formally described in 2014 by the Peter James de Lange from a specimen he collected near Papatea Bay. The description was published in PhytoKeys. The specific epithet (robusta) is a Latin word meaning "hard and strong like oak", referring to the stature of mature trees of this species. The taxonomic revision of the Kunzea ericoides complex by de Lange identified Kunzea robusta as a new species, but a more recent analysis of the Kunzea complex observed little genetic variation and morphological distinction between the species, questioning the evidence for 10 endemic Kunzea species and suggesting further revision.

Kānuka can also refer to Kunzea ericoides; it is a doublet of mānuka from Proto-Polynesian *nukanuka or *nuka which originally refers to Decaspermum fructicosum due to its similar small white flowers.

Distribution and habitat
Rawirinui is widespread and common on both the North and South Islands of New Zealand, and has often been confused with K. ericoides.  It is mostly found in coastal and low-lying areas and nearby hilly country, especially around forest margins, and does not usually grow in upper montane locations.

References

Flora of New Zealand
robusta
Plants described in 2014
Taxa named by Peter James de Lange
Taxa named by Hellmut R. Toelken